Indonesians in Taiwan form one of the island's larger communities of foreign residents. There are 144,651 people who have nationality of the Republic of Indonesia reside in Taiwan as of December 2010. This includes 19,554 males and 125,097 females, with 136,679 people serving as foreign laborers.

26,980 Indonesians (many of them with Chinese ancestry, such as Hakka people) had immigrated to Taiwan through international marriage, mostly female, and some had naturalized into Taiwan citizenship.

In Taiwan, employers can be fined if they force Muslim workers to come into contact with pork, something forbidden by the Muslim religion that most Indonesians profess. In Chiayi City, a couple was fined for the offence, in addition to other offences such as an imposing a long workday, and threats of deportation.

In 2013, an Indonesian worker, who married to a local Taiwanese man, built a mosque called the At-Taqwa Mosque in Dayuan Township, Taoyuan County (now Dayuan District, Taoyuan City) to support the growing number of Muslims, especially from the Indonesian workers community. Two other similar mosques, one in Donggang Township, Pingtung County called An-Nur Tongkang Mosque and another in Hualien City, Hualien County called Hualien Al-Falah Mosque were built by the local Indonesian communities in 2018.

See also
 Overseas Indonesian
 Indonesia–Taiwan relations

References

Asian diaspora in Taiwan
Taiwan
Indonesians
Indonesians